Arthur Acland Allen (11 August 1868 – 20 May 1939) was a British Liberal Party politician who served as a member of parliament (MP) between 1906 and 1918.

Allen was first elected to the House of Commons at the 1906 general election as MP for Christchurch in Hampshire. It was his third attempt to enter the House of Commons, having stood unsuccessfully in Thornbury in 1895 and in the Eastern Division of Dorset in 1900 general election (losing in 1900 by only 96 votes).

Christchurch had been held by the Conservative Party since 1885, and at the general election in January 1910, Allen lost his seat to a Conservative. At the next general election, in December 1910, he stood instead in the Scottish constituency of Dunbartonshire, where he won the seat.  However, at the 1918 general election he was not one of the 159 Liberal candidates to receive the "coalition coupon", and was overwhelmingly defeated by the Coalition Conservative candidate Sir William Raeburn; Allen was pushed into a poor third place behind the Labour Party candidate, winning a meagre 13% of the votes.

After his defeat in 1918, he did not stand for Parliament again.

References

External links 
 

1868 births
1939 deaths
Liberal Party (UK) MPs for English constituencies
Members of the Parliament of the United Kingdom for Scottish constituencies
Scottish Liberal Party MPs
UK MPs 1906–1910
UK MPs 1910–1918
Progressive Party (London) politicians
Members of London County Council